The 2011 NBA Finals was the championship series of the National Basketball Association's (NBA) 2010–11 season. A rematch of the 2006 Finals, the series is contested between the Western Conference champion Dallas Mavericks and the Eastern Conference champion Miami Heat. It was held from May 31 to June 12, 2011.

Entering the series as heavy favorites, the Miami Heat won the opening game and eventually led the series 2–1 before the Dallas Mavericks won the next three games to achieve their first championship in franchise history. Mavericks forward and German player Dirk Nowitzki was named Finals MVP, becoming the second European to win the award after Tony Parker (2007) and the first German player to do so.

Background

Both the Mavericks and Heat made their second appearance in the NBA Finals, the first for both teams being the 2006 NBA Finals. This Finals marked a rematch of those 2006 Finals, won by Miami in six games, after the Mavericks were up 2–0.

It was also the first time since 2006 that neither the Los Angeles Lakers nor the San Antonio Spurs represented the Western Conference in the Finals and only the second time since , and also the thirteenth consecutive NBA Finals to feature a Western Conference champion from either the states of California or Texas.

This was the first finals since 1998 not to feature Kobe Bryant (2000–2002, 2004, 2008–2010), Shaquille O'Neal (2000–2002, 2004, 2006) or Tim Duncan (1999, 2003, 2005, 2007).

The Mavericks' appearance also meant that three of North America's four major professional sports championships were played in the Dallas–Fort Worth metroplex in a span of eight months, with the 2010 World Series and Super Bowl XLV both occurring in nearby Arlington.

The Heat had home-court advantage by virtue of a better regular-season record than the Mavericks. This was only the second time that the Eastern Conference had home-court advantage during the Finals since the end of the Michael Jordan era in 1998. It also marks the first time since 1995 that the Eastern Conference team lost in the Finals despite having home-court advantage.

The 2011 series marked the first time a Finals match (Game 1) was played in the month of May since .

Among the players from both teams, only Dirk Nowitzki and Jason Terry of Dallas, and Dwyane Wade and Udonis Haslem of Miami, appeared in the 2006 series with the same team. Heat center Erick Dampier played for the Mavericks in 2006. Aside from Dampier, Caron Butler, Juwan Howard, and Shawn Marion are the only other players who have played for both the Mavericks and Heat. Eddie House, Žydrūnas Ilgauskas, LeBron James (James would reach the finals every year from 2011 to 2018, with both the Heat and the Cavaliers), and Jason Kidd have appeared in the Finals with different teams, with House (as a member of Boston's 2008 championship team), Wade and Haslem winning a championship ring. Mavericks head coach Rick Carlisle won a championship as a reserve for Boston's 1986 championship team making him only the eleventh person in NBA history to win a Finals as both a player and a coach.

Road to the Finals

Regular-season series

The Dallas Mavericks won both games in the regular season.

Series summary

Game summaries
All times are in Eastern Daylight Time (UTC−4).

Game 1

Game 1 was the first NBA Finals game to be held in the month of May since 1986. The Heat made only 28.6 percent of their shots during the first quarter, and this low scoring percentage early on left the Mavs with an 8-point lead early into the 3rd quarter. The Heat changed course from this point on, outscoring the Mavs 22–10 and taking a 65–61 lead going into the 4th quarter. Mavs power forward Dirk Nowitzki injured his finger within the last four minutes of the game, but remained in play, wearing a splint to support the torn tendon. Despite having a below-average performance early in the game, Heat shooting guard Dwyane Wade and small forward LeBron James collaborated on both defensive and offensive ends of the court in the fourth quarter, leading the Heat to win Game 1 over the Mavs 92–84.

Game 2

The Mavs' 15-point comeback was the biggest in an NBA Finals game since the 24-point comeback the Celtics made against the Lakers in Game 4 of the 2008 NBA Finals. Dirk Nowitzki hit a 3 with 26.7 seconds left to give the Mavericks a 93–90 lead. However, Mario Chalmers tied it with a 3 of his own with 24.5 seconds left when Jason Terry left him wide open. After Jason Kidd ran the clock down, Nowitzki then made a driving layup with his injured left hand with 3.6 seconds left. The Heat had no timeouts left, and Dwyane Wade's potential game-winning 3 hit the back rim at the buzzer as he fell to the ground in an attempt to draw a foul on Nowitzki. The Mavs' win broke the Heat's 9-game home winning streak in the playoffs, costing them a chance to tie the 1996 Bulls' mark of 10 straight. This was the second straight Finals with a 1–1 split after two games, after five straight years with one team leading 2–0 (2005–09).

Game 3

The Heat led most of the game, but the Mavericks fought back from a 14-point deficit. With 39.6 seconds left in the 4th, LeBron James found Chris Bosh for a 20-foot baseline jumper; Dirk Nowitzki had a chance to force OT, but missed a well-defended fadeaway jumper at the buzzer as the Heat handed Dallas another defeat to go up 2–1 in the series. It was Miami's sixth win in its last seven NBA Finals games, four by 3 points or less.

Game 4

Game 4 was a back-and-forth affair, with 12 lead changes and 15 ties. Miami went up 74–65 early in the fourth quarter on a baseline jumpshot by Udonis Haslem, tallying their largest lead of the game. After a timeout, Dallas answered with 4 straight points by Jason Terry, similar to the 6 straight he scored with Dallas down 15 halfway through the fourth quarter of Game 2. Dallas would take their first lead of the fourth quarter with 5:15 left on a fastbreak layup by Terry. They held the lead for the rest of the game, although Miami cut the lead to 1 twice in the final minute. Up 82–81 with 20 seconds left after Dwyane Wade missed 1 of 2 free throws, Dirk Nowitzki hit a driving layup with 14.4 seconds left to extend the lead to 3. After a dunk by Wade with 9 seconds left, 2 free throws by Terry pushed the lead back up to 3. With a chance to tie the game with a 3, Wade fumbled the inbounds pass with 6.7 seconds left, only to make a diving save to prevent a backcourt violation. The ball landed in Mike Miller's hands, whose desperation 3 airballed at the buzzer, preserving Dallas' 86–83 win. LeBron James scored just eight total points in Game 4 on 3-11 shooting including going 0-6 from the field when guarded by Jason Kidd or Jason Terry.

Game 5

After four low-scoring games, Game 5 saw the first time either team would break 100 points in this series. Dallas connected 13 times out of their 19 tries from three-point range. Jason Terry, Jason Kidd, and J. J. Barea combined to make 10 of those 13 made threes. Late in the first quarter, Dwyane Wade ran into Brian Cardinal and had to go to the locker room with a hip injury; he eventually returned and hit a 3 to cap a 9–0 run that put Miami in front 99–95 with less than 5 minutes left in the game. Unhappy with Terry for missing a defensive assignment and setting a poor cross-screen, Mavs coach Rick Carlisle pulled Terry from the game, telling him, "Refocus. I'm putting you right back in." After less than a minute, Carlisle subbed in Terry and made the crucial decision to run the offense through him for the rest of the game. This move ignited Dallas' offense, leading them on a game-winning 15–3 run in which Terry scored or assisted on 11 points. With Miami leading 100–97, Terry passed to Dirk Nowitzki, who drew a double team and then kicked it back out to Terry for a game-tying 3. Nowitzki then drove baseline on Chris Bosh for a two-handed dunk (assisted by Terry) with 2:44 left in the game to give the Mavs a 102–100 lead they would not relinquish. After LeBron James was called for an offensive foul (Tyson Chandler drew the charge), Terry found Kidd for another wide-open 3 that gave the Mavs a 105–100 lead with 1:26 left. After Chandler blocked Wade with 1:04 left, Bosh made 1 of 2 free throws to cut the Mavs' lead to 105–101. On the Mavs' next possession, Terry knocked down a 28-foot three-pointer with James closely guarding him to give the Mavs an insurmountable 108–101 lead with 33.3 seconds left. The Mavericks won 112–103 and grabbed a 3–2 series lead going back to Miami.

Game 6

LeBron James made his first four shots to contribute to the Heat taking a 20–11 lead. The Mavericks went to a zone defense that perplexed Miami and Dallas went on a 21–4 run in a span of 5½ minutes. They made 9 of 12 shots during this stretch with DeShawn Stevenson making three-pointers in a 24-second duration to give Dallas a 40–28 lead with 9:42 left in the first half. Dallas turned Miami's first six turnovers into 14 points. The Heat then went on a 14–0 run to take a 42–40 lead. With 6:25 left in the half, Stevenson along with Udonis Haslem and Mario Chalmers received technical fouls after a scuffle occurred at midcourt during a timeout. In the second half, James did not score until making a layup with 1:49 remaining in the third. The Mavericks led by nine going into the 4th quarter after Ian Mahinmi hit a buzzer beater to give Dallas an 81–72 lead. The Mavericks took a 12-point lead with 8:12 remaining. With 2:27 left, Nowitzki made a jump shot to help build the Mavericks' lead to 99–89. The Mavericks, who led for the final 22 minutes in the game, won their first championship in franchise history.
Nowitzki was named Finals MVP. He had a poor shooting performance in the first half but managed to score 18 points in the second half. When the final buzzer sounded, an emotional Nowitzki went straight to the locker room in tears, although he re-emerged for the trophy presentation.

Rosters

Dallas Mavericks

Miami Heat

Player statistics

Dallas Mavericks
|-
| align="left" |  || 6 || 3 || 21.4 || .382 || .333 || .714 || 2.2 || 3.2 || 0.5 || 0.0 || 8.8
|-
| align="left" |  || 5 || 0 || 6.1 || .667 || .667 || .500 || 0.2 || 0.2 || 0.2 || 0.0 || 1.4
|-
| align="left" |  || 6 || 6 || 37.3 || .594 || .000 || .625 || 8.8 || 0.7 || 1.2 || 1.2 || 9.7
|-
| align="left" |  || 3 || 0 || 8.5 || .333 || .000 || .500 || 2.3 || 0.0 || 0.3 || 1.0 || 1.7
|-
| align="left" |  || 6 || 6 || 37.4 || .389 || .429 || .750 || 4.5 || 6.3 || 1.2 || 0.8 || 7.7
|-
| align="left" |  || 3 || 0 || 9.0 || .600 || .000 || .600 || 1.7 || 0.0 || 0.3 || 0.0 || 3.0
|-
| align="left" |  || 6 || 6 || 35.8 || .479 || .000 || .824 || 6.3 || 2.3 || 0.8 || 0.7 || 13.7
|-! style="background:#FDE910;"
| align="left" |  || 6 || 6 || 40.4 || .416 || .368 || .978 || 9.7 || 2.0 || 0.7 || 0.7 || 26.0
|-
| align="left" |  || 6 || 3 || 17.2 || .542 || .565 || .750 || 1.5 || 0.3 || 0.7 || 0.2 || 7.0
|-
| align="left" |  || 4 || 0 || 6.4 || .200 || .000 || .000 || 0.8 || 0.0 || 0.5 || 0.0 || 0.5
|-
| align="left" |  || 6 || 0 || 32.6 || .494 || .393 || .750 || 2.0 || 3.2 || 1.3 || 0.0 || 18.0

Miami Heat

|-
| align="left" |  || 6 || 6 || 20.6 || .286 || .000 || .000 || 3.5 || 0.3 || 0.2 || 1.2 || 1.3
|-
| align="left" |  || 5 || 5 || 17.4 || .350 || .294 || .000 || 1.4 || 1.0 || 1.4 || 0.2 || 3.8
|-
| align="left" |  || 6 || 6 || 39.4 || .413 || .000 || .778 || 7.3 || 1.0 || 0.2 || 0.5 || 18.5
|-
| align="left" |  || 6 || 1 || 28.9 || .426 || .400 || .739 || 2.7 || 3.5 || 1.7 || 0.0 || 11.8
|-
| align="left" |  || 6 || 0 || 29.4 || .450 || .000 || .800 || 5.2 || 0.7 || 0.5 || 0.5 || 6.7
|-
| align="left" |  || 2 || 0 || 12.3 || .333 || .375 || .000 || 2.0 || 0.5 || 1.0 || 0.0 || 4.5
|-
| align="left" |  || 5 || 0 || 5.9 || .600 || .000 || .500 || 1.2 || 0.2 || 0.0 || 0.0 || 1.8
|-
| align="left" |  || 6 || 6 || 43.6 || .478 || .321 || .600 || 7.2 || 6.8 || 1.7 || 0.5 || 17.8
|-
| align="left" |  || 6 || 0 || 15.6 || .304 || .389 || .000 || 2.8 || 0.8 || 0.8 || 0.2 || 3.5
|-
| align="left" |  || 6 || 6 || 39.0 || .546 || .304 || .694 || 7.0 || 5.2 || 1.5 || 1.5 || 26.5

Broadcast notes
The Finals were originally projected to begin on Thursday, June 9, but (along with the entire NBA schedule) were pushed up ahead one week to Thursday, June 2 due to negotiations on an impending league-wide lockout at the end of the season. They were again pushed ahead to a start date of May 31 as both conference finals series ended in five games.

The Finals were televised in the United States through ABC, with Mike Breen, Jeff Van Gundy, and Mark Jackson as announcers. Doris Burke was the sideline reporter, while Stuart Scott hosted the championship presentation. Scott also hosted the pre-game and halftime shows along with Jon Barry, Michael Wilbon, and Magic Johnson. ESPN Radio aired the Finals nationally on radio, with Mike Tirico, Hubie Brown, and Jack Ramsay announcing.

References

External links
Official website of the 2011 NBA Finals
2011 NBA Finals at ESPN
2011 NBA Finals at Basketball-Reference.com

National Basketball Association Finals
Finals
NBA
NBA
N
N
2010s in Dallas
N
May 2011 sports events in the United States
June 2011 sports events in the United States
Sports competitions in Dallas
Sports competitions in Miami
ABS-CBN television specials